John Edward Nisby (September 9, 1936 – February 6, 2011) was an American football guard in the National Football League. He played professionally for the Pittsburgh Steelers and Washington Redskins, and was one of the first African American players to play for the Washington Redskins.

Early life
Nisby was born in San Francisco, California, and attended Edison High School in Stockton, California. He played college football at San Joaquin Delta College and at the University of the Pacific. He earned his master's degree from the University of Oregon.

Professional career
Nisby was drafted in the sixth round (70th pick overall) of the 1957 NFL Draft by the Green Bay Packers. He played for eight seasons in the NFL, and was named to the Pro Bowl in 1959, 1961, and 1962. While playing for the Steelers, Nisby worked with the Pittsburgh Courier to work for equal employment policies in companies that did business with the Steelers.

In 1962, Nisby became one of the first African American players (along with Bobby Mitchell and Leroy Jackson) to play for the Washington Redskins, the last team in the NFL to integrate. That year, Nisby and Mitchell became the first black Washington Redskins players to be named to the Pro Bowl.

Life after the NFL
When the Redskins released Nisby in 1964, he retired from football and became Director of the "College Readiness Program" at San Joaquin Delta College. He was also a City Councilman in Stockton, California. In 1987, Nisby was made a member of the Stockton Black Sports Hall of Fame.

Nisby died on February 6, 2011, in Stockton.

References

1936 births
2011 deaths
American football offensive guards
Pacific Tigers football players
Pittsburgh Steelers players
Washington Redskins players
Eastern Conference Pro Bowl players
Deaths from pneumonia in California
Delta College Mustangs football players